Fred Lane may refer to:
Fred Lane (American football) (1975–2000), Carolina Panthers running back
Fred Lane (jockey) (1892–1979), winner of the 1932 Epsom Derby
Reverend Fred Lane, stage name of T.R. Reed
Frederick Lane (1880–1969), Australian swimmer
Frederic C. Lane (1900–1984), actor